Angela Agostini (1880-?) was an Italian botanist and mycologist who conducted research at the Botanical Institute of the University of Pavia.

References 

1880 births
20th-century Italian women scientists
20th-century Italian botanists
Women botanists
Year of death missing